Social Neuroscience is a peer-reviewed academic journal covering research in social neuroscience. It was founded in March 2006 by Jean Decety and Julian Paul Keenan. It is published by Psychology Press, a division of Taylor and Francis. The current editor is Paul J. Eslinger (Penn State Hershey Medical Center). According to the Journal Citation Reports, the journal has a 2011 impact factor of 2.738, ranking it 23rd out of 75 journals in the category "Psychology" and 123rd out of 244 journals in the category "Neuroscience". Originally, it published 3 issues per year (with the last issue being a double one).

References 

Social Neuroscience: A new journal https://www.tandfonline.com/doi/full/10.1080/17470910600683549

External links 
 

Neuroscience journals
Cognitive science journals
Publications established in 2006
Bimonthly journals
Taylor & Francis academic journals
English-language journals
Social psychology journals